The Hadlyme North Historic District is an  historic district located in the southwest corner of the town of East Haddam, Connecticut (just north of the town line with Lyme). It represents the historic core of the village of Hadlyme, which straddles the town line, and consists primarily of two north-south roads, Town Street (Route 82 and Old Town Street).  The village arose around a church society founded in 1743, and grew with the development of small industries along area waterways. It was listed on the National Register of Historic Places in 1988.

Description and history
The name Hadlyme was formed of a combination of the names of the two townships in which it is located: Haddam and Lyme. East Haddam was incorporated as a separate town from Haddam in 1734.  There were three churches established in East Haddam in the following years, including the Hadlyme Ecclesiastical Society, which was founded in 1742.  That congregation met in buildings in the village center until 1890, and was one of its main civic focuses.  Industry in the village center was limited, because Hungerford Brook, which runs between Town Street and Old Town Street, did not provide very much power.  Traces of a tannery remain, as does a mill pond associated with an otherwise undocumented endeavour.

The historic district includes 39 contributing buildings and 12 non-contributing buildings.  There are 16 houses, in styles ranging from Georgian (built c. 1750) to the early 20th century Colonial Revival; while most are well preserved, they are not of great architectural significance.  Three churches stand in the district, of which only the Hadlyme Congregational Church building (an 1840 Greek Revival edifice) is still in active use.  The village cemetery, founded in 1750, is just north of the church.

The larger Hadlyme area is bordered to the west by the Connecticut River where a ferry to Chester still runs (Route 148).  The ferry and dock were where shipments along the river would be received, primarily by not exclusively for Gillette Castle (Formerly Seventh Sister) during the late 1800s.

The intersection of Route 82 and Route 148 is known as Hadlyme "Four Corners". The post office for the district is located here (US ZIP 06371) as well as a country store and carriage factory turned antique shop.

Notable people
Lurana W. Sheldon
Alice Hamilton

See also

Hadlyme Ferry Historic District
National Register of Historic Places listings in New London County, Connecticut
National Register of Historic Places listings in Middlesex County, Connecticut

References

East Haddam, Connecticut
Lyme, Connecticut
Colonial architecture in Connecticut
Historic districts in Middlesex County, Connecticut
Historic districts in New London County, Connecticut
National Register of Historic Places in Middlesex County, Connecticut
National Register of Historic Places in New London County, Connecticut
Historic districts on the National Register of Historic Places in Connecticut